Eucalyptus apothalassica is a tree native to New South Wales in eastern Australia. Common names for the species include inland white mahogany.

Description
The rough, fibrous, grey or grey-brown bark sometimes feels prickly to touch The bark is attached to the trunk in flat strips rather than typical stringybark.

The dull or glossy, green, concolorous adult leaves are alternately arranged. It blooms around October and has produces axillary unbranched
inflorescences which often are situated near ends of branches in clusters. After flowering pedicellate fruits form with a hemispherical or barrel-shape.

Taxonomy
The species was first formally described by the botanists Lawrence Alexander Sidney Johnson and Kenneth Hill in 1990 in the work New taxa and combinations in Eucalyptus and Angophora (Myrtaceae) as published in the journal Telopea.

The specific epithet is taken from the Greek words  apo meaning away from and thalassicos meaning of the sea in reference to its range compared to other white mahogany species which are found in more coastal areas.

E. apothalassica is part of the white mahogany group as recognised by Ken Hill, others in the group include; Eucalyptus acmenoides, Eucalyptus mediocris, Eucalyptus carnea, Eucalyptus helidonica, Eucalyptus latisinensis, Eucalyptus psammitica and Eucalyptus umbra.

Distribution
The tree is found as a part of dry sclerophyll woodland communities found on sandstone based soils. It is endemic around Yetman in northern New South Wales in the south extending north to Inglewood, Kogan and Yarraman in south eastern Queensland.

References

apothalassica
Myrtales of Australia
Flora of New South Wales
Flora of Queensland
Trees of Australia
Plants described in 1990